The 2022–23 Iowa Hawkeyes men's basketball team represented the University of Iowa during the 2022–23 NCAA Division I men's basketball season. The team was led by 13th-year head coach Fran McCaffery and played its home games at Carver–Hawkeye Arena as members of the Big Ten Conference.

Iowa completed the season 19–14, 11–9 in Big Ten play to finish in a four-way tie for fifth place. As the No. 5 seed in the Big Ten tournament, it lost its first game to No. 13 seed Ohio State. The Hawkeyes received the No. 8 seed in the Midwest region of the NCAA tournament and lost to No. 9 seeded Auburn in the round of 64.

Junior forward Kris Murray earned First-team All-Big Ten and Third-team AP All-America honors while averaging 20.2 points per game. It was the fourth consecutive season that an Iowa player was named an AP All-American, after twin Keegan Murray (2021-2022) and Luka Garza (2019–2020 and 2020–21).

Previous season
The Hawkeyes finished the 2021–22 season 26–10, 12–8 in Big Ten play to finish in a three-way tie for fourth place. The 26 wins were the most wins in a season for Iowa since the Elite Eight team in 1986–87 earned 30 wins. As the No. 5 seed in the Big Ten tournament, they defeated Northwestern, Rutgers, Indiana, and Purdue to win the tournament championship. As a result, the Hawkeyes received the conference's automatic bid to the NCAA tournament as the No. 5 seed in the Midwest region. The Hawkeyes were upset by No. 12-seeded Richmond in the First Round.

Sophomore forward Keegan Murray earned consensus First-team All-American honors, and established a new school record for points in a season. It was the third consecutive season that an Iowa player was selected a consensus First-team All-American (Luka Garza, 2019–20 and 2020–21) and set a new school record for points in a season.

Offseason

Departures

Recruiting classes

2022 recruiting class

2023 recruiting class

Roster

 
Source

Schedule and results

|-
!colspan=9 style=|Exhibition

|-
!colspan=9 style=|Regular season

|-
!colspan=9 style=|Big Ten tournament

|-
!colspan=9 style=|NCAA tournament

Source

Rankings

References

Iowa
Iowa Hawkeyes men's basketball seasons
Hawk
Hawk
Iowa